The 1933–34 Prima Divisione was the third level league of the 34th Italian football championship.

In 1928, FIGC had decided a reform of the league structure of Italian football. The top-level league was the National Division, composed by the two divisions of Serie A and Serie B. Under them, there were the local championship, the major one being the First Division, that in 1935 will take the name of Serie C. Starting from this season, the winners and the runners-up of the eight groups of First Division would be admitted to the final rounds, where four tickets of promotion to Serie B were available, whereas the scheduled relegations were annulled by the Federation which expanded the division. Until this season, reserve teams of club belonging to Serie A were admitted in First Division.

Legend

Girone A

Girone B

Girone C

Girone D

Girone E

Girone F

Girone G

Girone H

Final rounds

Girone A

Girone B

Girone C

Girone D

Catania, L'Aquila, Lucchese and Pisa promoted to 1934–35 Serie B.

Serie C seasons
3
Italy